Damen is a station on the Chicago Transit Authority's 'L' system, serving the Pink Line and the Pilsen neighborhood.

History
Damen station opened in 1896 as part of the Metropolitan West Side Elevated's Douglas Park branch. At the time the entrance was on Hoyne Avenue. Like the Kostner station to the west, during reconstruction of the Douglas branch in 2003, Damen Avenue (the block east of Hoyne) was made the site of the main entrance for better connection with the CTA route 50 Damen. At this time the name of the station was changed to "Damen" and Hoyne became an auxiliary entrance.

Bus connections
CTA
  50 Damen 
Pace
  755 Plainfield - IMD - West Loop Express (Weekday Rush Hours only)

Notes and references

Notes

References

External links
Damen (Cermak Branch) Station Page
Damen Avenue entrance from Google Maps Street View
Hoyne Avenue entrance from Google Maps Street View

CTA Pink Line stations
Railway stations in the United States opened in 1896
Lower West Side, Chicago